Uijeongbu High School (Korean: 의정부고등학교, Hanja: 議政府高等學校), also known as "'UIGO'", is a public boarding high school located in Ganeung-dong, Uijeongbu, South Korea. a prestigious high school in South Korea and requires the completion of an application and admissions test by applicant students. The school was established on January 5, 1974, and opened its doors on March 6, 1974. In 2004, Uijeongbu High School was designated an excellent school by the South Korean government.

Description
Uijeongbu High School's motto is "Morality, Autonomy, Ingenuity, Global Leadership, Healthy". The school provides Advanced Academic Programme courses. This education system aims to provide the students with practical applications of education for the gifted students. From this course, many Uijeongbu High School students are accepted to prestigious universities in South Korea and abroad with improved creative thinking and global leadership.

Uijeongbu high school's varsity teams:
Speed skating
Curling
Soccer

References 

Education in Gyeonggi Province
High schools in South Korea
Boarding schools in South Korea
Educational institutions established in 1974
Boys' schools in South Korea